Louis Goldsmith (14 September 1846 – 15 September 1911) was an Australian cricketer. He played seven first-class cricket matches for Victoria between 1869 and 1875.

See also
 List of Victoria first-class cricketers

References

1846 births
1911 deaths
Australian cricketers
Victoria cricketers
Cricketers from Melbourne